The Miss Delaware competition is the pageant that selects the representative of Delaware in the Miss America pageant. The event takes place annually in the month of June and has previously been held in Rehoboth Beach at Convention Hall, and in the state capital of Dover, Delaware at the Dover Downs Hotel and Casino. Miss Delaware serves as the official hostess to the state of Delaware. In 2023, the pageant announced that it will be held at Harrington Raceway & Casino in Harrington.

Grace Otley of Hockessin was crowned Miss Delaware on June 17, 2022, at Milton Theater in Milton. She competed for the title of Miss America 2023 at the Mohegan Sun in Uncasville, Connecticut in December 2022.

Results summary
The following is a visual summary of the past results of Miss Delaware titleholders at the national Miss America pageants/competitions. The year in parentheses indicates the year of the national competition during which a placement and/or award was garnered, not the year attached to the contestant's state title.

Placements
Top 10: Lois Anne Alava (1954), Catherine Lawton (1973), Debora Rica Lipford (1977), Kayla Martell (2011)
 Top 15: Peggy Insolo (1940), Galen Giaccone (2009)

Awards

Preliminary awards
 Preliminary Lifestyle and Fitness: Janice Anne Albro (1979)
 Preliminary Talent: Lois Anne Alava (1954), Catherine Lawton (1973), Junnie Cross (2001), Galen Giaccone (2009)

Non-finalist awards
 Non-finalist Talent: Robin Jane Whemper (1962), Elaine Campanelli (1976), Sandra Louise Aiken (1978), Lisa Marie Munzert (1991), Jennifer Lin Kaczmarczyk (1994), Alison White (1998), Rebecca Bledsoe (2006), Maria Cahill (2012), Rebecca Jackson (2014), Brooke Mitchell (2016)
 Non-finalist Interview: Alyssa Murray (2013)

Other awards
 Miss Congeniality: Paula Kusmer (1972)
Equity and Justice Finalist: Sophie Phillips (2022)
 George Cavalier Talent Award: Anne Marie Jarka (1988)
 Bernie Wayne Scholarship for the Performing Arts: Junnie Cross (2001)
 Bert Parks Talent Award: Michelle Harris (1996), Junnie Cross (2001)
 Quality of Life Award 1st runners-up: Kayla Martell (2011), Brittany Lewis (2015)
 Quality of Life Award Finalists: Junnie Cross (2001), Linda Kurtz (2005), Alyssa Murray (2012)
 Forever Miss Americas Scholarship: Grace Otley (2023)

Winners

External links
 Miss Delaware Official Website
 Miss Delaware Blog

References

Beauty pageants in Delaware
Delaware
Women in Delaware
Annual events in Delaware